Anna Mercedes Morris (born November 6, 1978) is a professional Hollywood stuntwoman and actress. She also goes by the alias Michelle Diamond.

Career
She has performed stunts on various shows and films including The Shield, Wizards of Waverly Place, CSI: NY, Cemetery Gates, and 2 Fast 2 Furious. She acts as a stunt double for various actors on shows including The Riches, Ugly Betty (for America Ferrera), and Without a Trace, and films such as Black Christmas, Dead & Deader (for Susan Ward), The Thirst: Blood War, Lonely Street and Bratz: The Movie.

Morris has also appeared on-screen; she had a small role on Cemetery Gates as a bicyclist. On-screen though, she is probably better known for competing (with the nickname of "Roadrunner") on a 1993 episode of Nickelodeon sports show, Nickelodeon GUTS, where she battled through a bad knee suffered in the Basic Training event to win the gold medal in the entire competition.

References

External links

1978 births
Actresses from Charlotte, North Carolina
American film actresses
American television actresses
American stunt performers
Living people
Contestants on American game shows
Actresses from North Carolina
21st-century American women